Hair care is an overall term for hygiene and cosmetology involving the hair which grows from the human scalp, and to a lesser extent facial, pubic and other body hair. Hair care routines differ according to an individual's culture and the physical characteristics of one's hair. Hair may be colored, trimmed, shaved, plucked or otherwise removed with treatments such as waxing, sugaring and threading. Hair care services are offered in salons, barbershops and day spas, and products are available commercially for home use. Laser hair removal and electrolysis are also available, though these are provided (in the US) by licensed professionals in medical offices or speciality spas.

Hair cleaning and conditioning

Biological processes and hygiene

Care of the hair and care of the scalp skin may appear separate, but are actually intertwined because hair grows from beneath the skin. The living parts of hair (hair follicle, hair root, root sheath and sebaceous gland) are beneath the skin, while the actual hair shaft which emerges (the cuticle which covers the cortex and medulla) has no living processes. Damage or changes made to the visible hair shaft cannot be repaired by a biological process, though much can be done to manage hair and ensure that the cuticle remains intact.

Scalp skin, just like any other skin on the body, must be kept healthy to ensure a healthy body and healthy hair production. If the scalp is cleaned regularly by those who have rough hair or have a hair-fall problem, it can result in loss of hair. However, not all scalp disorders are a result of bacterial infections. Some arise inexplicably, and often only the symptoms can be treated for management of the condition (example: dandruff). There are also bacteria that can affect the hair itself. Head lice is probably the most common hair and scalp ailment worldwide. Head lice can be removed with great attention to detail, and studies show it is not necessarily associated with poor hygiene.  More recent studies reveal that head lice actually thrive in clean hair. In  this way, hair washing as a term may be a bit misleading, as what is necessary in healthy hair production and maintenance is often simply cleaning the surface of the scalp skin, the way the skin all over the body requires cleaning for good hygiene.

The sebaceous glands in human skin produce sebum, which is composed primarily of fatty acids. Sebum acts to protect hair and skin, and can inhibit the growth of microorganisms on the skin. Sebum contributes to the skin's slightly acidic natural pH somewhere between 5 and 6.8 on the pH spectrum. This oily substance gives hair moisture and shine as it travels naturally down the hair shaft, and serves as a protective substance by preventing the hair from drying out or absorbing excessive amounts of external substances. Even though sebum serves as a protective substance, too much of this oily substance can cause blockage around hair follicles. This blockage is usually from dandruff or even dead skin. As a result, "blocked or obstructed hair follicles" may prevent hair from producing. Sebum is also distributed down the hair shaft "mechanically" by brushing and combing. When sebum is present in excess, the roots of the hair can appear oily, greasy, and darker than normal, and the hair may stick together.

Hair cleaning
Washing hair removes excess sweat and oil, as well as unwanted products from the hair and scalp. Often hair is washed as part of a shower or bathing with shampoo, a specialized surfactant. Shampoos work by applying water and shampoo to the hair. The shampoo breaks the surface tension of the water, allowing the hair to become soaked. This is known as the wetting action.  The wetting action is caused by the head of the shampoo molecule attracting the water to the hair shaft.  Conversely, the tail of the shampoo molecule is attracted to the grease, dirt and oil on the hair shaft.  The physical action of shampooing makes the grease and dirt become an emulsion that is then rinsed away with the water.  This is known as the emulsifying action.  Sulfate free shampoos are less harming on color treated hair than normal shampoos that contain sulfates.  Sulfates strip away natural oils as well as hair dye.  Sulfates are also responsible for the foaming effect of shampoos.
Shampoos have a pH of between 4 & 6.   Acidic shampoos are the most common type used and maintain or improve the condition of the hair as they don't swell the hairshaft and don't strip the natural oils.

Hairstyling tools